Pittosporum ceylanicum is a species of plant in the Pittosporaceae family. It is endemic to Sri Lanka.

Culture
Known as "කෙටිය - ketiya" in Sinhala.

References

Endemic flora of Sri Lanka
ceylanicum